General elections were held in Bosnia and Herzegovina on 12 and 13 September 1998. Voter turnout was 68.0% in the parliamentary election and 67.8% in the presidential election.

The elections for the House of Representatives were divided into two; one for the Federation of Bosnia and Herzegovina and one for Republika Srpska. In the presidential election, voters in the Federation re-elected Bosniak Alija Izetbegović and elected Croat Ante Jelavić, while voters in Republika Srpska elected Serb Živko Radišić. The Coalition for Unity and Democracy, an alliance of the Party of Democratic Action, the Party for Bosnia and Herzegovina, the Liberal Party and the Civic Democratic Party, emerged as the largest party in the House of Representatives, winning 17 of the 42 seats.

Results

Presidency

House of Representatives

By entity

References

General
Elections in Bosnia and Herzegovina
Bosnia
Bosnia